Ernest Knight Hoar (20 October 1898 – 1 May 1979) was an Australian politician. He was a Labor member of the Western Australian Legislative Assembly from 1943 to 1957, representing Nelson until 1950 and Warren-Blackwood thereafter. He served as Minister for Lands and Agriculture from 1953 to 1957.

References

1898 births
1979 deaths
English emigrants to Australia
People from Luton
Members of the Western Australian Legislative Assembly
Australian Labor Party members of the Parliament of Western Australia
20th-century Australian politicians